Pergase was a name of two demoi in ancient Attica of the phyle of Erechtheis: Upper Pergase and Lower Pergase. Aristophanes places these demoi on the road between Athens and Aphidna.

References

Populated places in ancient Attica
Former populated places in Greece
Demoi